Two Fisted Justice may refer to:

  Two Fisted Justice (1924 film), a silent western film directed by Dick Hatton
  Two Fisted Justice (1931 film), a western film directed by George Arthur Durlam
  Two Fisted Justice (1943 film), a western film directed by Robert Emmett Tansey